The 2014 Delaware Fightin' Blue Hens football team represented the University of Delaware as a member of the Colonial Athletic Association (CAA) during the 2014 NCAA Division I FCS football season. Led by second-year head coach Dave Brock, the Fightin' Blue Hens compiled an overall record of 6–6 with a mark of 4–4 in conference play, placing in a four-way tie for fifth in the CAA. The team played home games at Delaware Stadium in Newark, Delaware.

Previous season

Delaware would start strong through the beginning of November, reaching a record of 7–2 (4–1 CAA) following a thrilling win at Towson.  However, from that point, the Hens faded with a three-game losing streak to end the year at 7–5 (4–4 CAA).  The slide was particularly painful for the faithful with the last loss coming from a frantic Villanova comeback to eliminate the Hens from playoff contention.

Preseason

Recruiting class
Delaware announced the signing of 22 players on February 5, 2014.

Transfers
Three players transferred into Delaware for the 2014 Season:

Preseason awards
Nick Boyle – CAA Football Preseason All-Conference Team (Tight End)
Eric Enderson – CAA Football Preseason All-Conference Team (Punter), The Sports Network FCS Preseason All-American Second Team (Punter)
Michael Johnson – The Sports Network FCS Preseason All-American Third Team (All Purpose).
Jalen Randolph – CoSIDA/ESPN The Magazine Academic All-American Candidate
Ryan Torza – CoSIDA/ESPN The Magazine Academic All-American Candidate
Laith Wallschleger – CoSIDA/ESPN The Magazine Academic All-American Candidate

Conference predictions
Delaware was picked to finish sixth in the CAA Preseason Poll.
CAA Preseason Poll (First Place Votes)
1. New Hampshire (15)
2. Villanova (2)
3. Richmond (3)
4. William & Mary (3)
5. Towson
6. Delaware
7. Maine
8. James Madison (1)
9. Stony Brook
10. UAlbany
11. Rhode Island
12. Elon

Preseason rankings

FCS Coaches Poll
Delaware received 15 votes in the Preseason Coaches Poll, resulting in a tie for 35th.  The Blue Hens face four teams ranked in the preseason poll (#4 New Hampshire, #7 Towson, #13 Villanova, and #22 William & Mary).  In addition, they meet up with two teams to receive votes but not be ranked (James Madison and Sacred Heart).

The Sports Network FCS Poll
Delaware received 213 votes in the Preseason TSN poll, good for 29th overall.  The Blue Hens are scheduled to face four teams that were ranked in the poll in 2014 (#4 New Hampshire, #12 Villanova, #13 Towson, and #19 William & Mary).  In addition, they will face two teams that received votes but were not in the top 25 (James Madison – 180 votes and Sacred Heart – 14 votes).

Schedule

Opening depth chart

Coaching staff

Roster

Game summaries

Pittsburgh

Pittsburgh was coming off a win over Bowling Green in the Little Caesars Pizza Bowl in 2013.

First time Delaware was shut out since September 14, 1996 (a 27–0 loss at Villanova), snapping a streak of 220 games.
Largest margin of defeat for Delaware since September 24, 1921 (an 89–0 loss at Pennsylvania).
Offensive MVP: Nick Boyle – TE
Defensive MVP: Simba Gwashavanhu – SS
Special Teams MVP: Andrew Opoku – WR
Pittsburgh went on to fall to Houston in the Armed Forces Bowl.

Delaware State

Postponed from September 6 at 6 PM to September 7 at 12 PM due to lightning in the area.
Jalen Randolph named Nate Beasley MVP.
Offensive MVP: Jalen Randolph – RB
Defensive MVP: Vince Hollerman – DE
Special Teams MVP: Michael Johnson – WR

Colgate

James Madison

Delaware's first OT win since September 10, 2005, against Lehigh (34–33).  Hens had lost three consecutive OT games since (2007 v. Richmond (5OT), 2010 v. Villanova, and 2012 v. Towson).
James Madison went on to fall in the first round of the NCAA First Round to Liberty.

Sacred Heart

Sacred Heart was coming off of a NEC championship and a First Round loss to Fordham in 2013.
Delaware's first FCS non-conference loss since January 7, 2011 (v. Eastern Washington, in the National Championship game).
Delaware's first regular season FCS non-conference loss since September 20, 2008 (at Furman).
Delaware's first home non-conference loss since September 16, 2006 (v. Albany).
Sacred Heart went on to win the NEC championship and fall in the NCAA First Round to Fordham.

Elon

Towson

Towson was coming off a loss in the National Championship Game to North Dakota State in 2013.
First Homecoming loss since October 31, 2009 to James Madison (20–8).

William & Mary

Rhode Island

Albany

New Hampshire

New Hampshire was coming off a Semifinal loss to North Dakota State in 2013.
New Hampshire went on to win the CAA championship and fall to Illinois State in the NCAA Semifinals.

Villanova

Villanova went on to fall in the NCAA Quarterfinals to Sam Houston State.

Ranking movements

References

Delaware
Delaware Fightin' Blue Hens football seasons
Delaware Fightin' Blue Hens football